Andrey Belousov is a retired Ukrainian professional footballer.

Career
Belousov started playing at Chernihiv Polytechnic and then for the local team Desna Chernihiv in Ukrainian Second League. In 1996 he signed with Kryvbas Kryvyi Rih. He made his debut in the Ukrainian Premier League on 20 July 1996 against FC Dnipropetrovsk. In 1999 he moved to Akzhayik in the Kazakh top division. 

He spent most of the remainder of his career in the lower divisions of Ukraine, Russia and Kazakhstan.

References

External links 
 Andrey Belousov footballfacts.ru
 Andrey Belousov allplayers.in.ua

1972 births
Living people
Soviet footballers
Ukrainian footballers
Footballers from Chernihiv
FC Desna Chernihiv players
FC Cheksyl Chernihiv players
FC Ros Bila Tserkva players
FC Kryvbas Kryvyi Rih players
FC Slavutych players
FC Spartak Semey players
FC Volyn Lutsk players
FC Sokil Zolochiv players
FC Okean Nakhodka players
FC Kovel-Volyn Kovel players
FC Helios Kharkiv players
MFC Mykolaiv players
FC Podillya Khmelnytskyi players
FC Akzhayik players
Ukrainian Second League players
Association football defenders